Empyrion - Galactic Survival is an open-world sandbox adventure game. It was released via early access on 5 August 2015 by Eleon Game Studios. This 3D open-world game explores a world of aliens. In order for humans to survive, they must explore the land and adapt to its environment.

Gameplay 
Players crash land on an alien planet, where they must survive a hostile environment. Their escape pod includes a variety of common resources, though they need to forage to find rarer materials.  Using the pod's constructor, they can build a variety of objects, including bases, ground vehicles, and spaceships.  In multiplayer, the planets are persistent worlds, and players can interact with each other, including trading and player versus player combat.

Development 
Empyrion was designed to focus on making exploration interesting.  In an interview, the team referenced a German proverb that translates to "the journey is the reward".  Comparing their game to No Man's Sky, Eleon said they wanted to make exploration fun first, then work on expanding the game to support a massive number of planets.  Community involvement is another focus.  A rotating number of player-created schematics for bases and ships are featured in-game, and surveys determine what features Eleon prioritizes. The game left Early Access "Alpha" in 2020.

References

External links
 

2015 video games
Open-world video games
Video games developed in Switzerland
Windows games
Windows-only games
Early access video games
Video games with Steam Workshop support